Clive Robert Whitehead (born 24 November 1955) is an English former footballer.

Life and career 
Whitehead was born in Northfield, Birmingham. He played for Bordesley Green Boys and Northfield Juniors during his youth and had a trial with Wolverhampton Wanderers in 1971. In March 1973 he joined Bristol City and turned professional with the club five months later. He scored the winning goal to help the club to achieve promotion from the Second Division in 1975–76. Whitehead was transferred to West Bromwich Albion in November 1981, for a fee of £100,000, and made his debut for his new club away at Tottenham Hotspur in a First Division match. During the 1985–86 season he was loaned to Albion's local rivals Wolverhampton Wanderers. He joined Portsmouth on a free transfer in July 1987 and remained with the club until another free transfer to Exeter City in July 1989. A move to Yeovil Town followed in October 1990, with Whitehead taking up the role of player-manager, but he was dismissed from the position in April 1991. He then worked as an academy coach and scout at his former club Bristol City and flirted with the idea of becoming the clubs first ever Community Officer, and later as a football agent and referee's assessor.

Whitehead's older brother Alan also played professional football.

References 

1955 births
Living people
Footballers from Birmingham, West Midlands
English footballers
Bristol City F.C. players
West Bromwich Albion F.C. players
Portsmouth F.C. players
Wolverhampton Wanderers F.C. players
Exeter City F.C. players
Yeovil Town F.C. players
Yeovil Town F.C. managers
English Football League players
Association football utility players
Association football midfielders
English football managers